Finlayson Point Provincial Park is a provincial park in Temagami, northeastern Ontario, Canada, just west of Ontario Highway 11. It offers access to Lake Temagami and the Lady Evelyn-Smoothwater Provincial Park. There is a plaque in the park honouring English naturalist Grey Owl.

References

External links

Provincial parks of Ontario
Parks in Nipissing District
Geography of Temagami
Protected areas established in 1963
1963 establishments in Ontario